Josef Brunner  (12 August 1928 – 25 January 2012) was a German politician, representative of the Christian Social Union of Bavaria. From 1980 to 1987 and also May–October 1990, he was a member of the German Bundestag.

See also
List of Bavarian Christian Social Union politicians

References

1928 births
2012 deaths
Members of the Bundestag for Bavaria
Members of the Bundestag 1987–1990
Members of the Bundestag 1983–1987
Members of the Bundestag 1980–1983
Members of the Bundestag for the Christian Social Union in Bavaria